Club Deportivo Naval Reinosa, simply known as Naval, is a Spanish football team based in Reinosa, in the autonomous community of Cantabria. Founded in 1928, it plays in Tercera División RFEF – Group 3, holding home matches at Campo de San Francisco.

History 
In the 2014–15 season the club managed to promote to Tercera División by finishing 3rd in the Preferente Cantabria category. In the 2018–19 season the club was relegated from Tercera División to the regional category Preferente Cantabria.

Season to season

35 seasons in Tercera División
1 season in Tercera División RFEF

References

External links
 
ArefePedia team profile 
Fútbol Regional profile 
Soccerway team profile

Football clubs in Cantabria
Association football clubs established in 1928
1928 establishments in Spain